Bicol Regional Science High School
(colloquially BreSci) is the Regional Science High School for Bicol Region (Region V) in the Philippines. It is located in barangay Tuburan, Ligao City, Albay and was established in June 1994.

History
Bicol Regional Science High School (BRSHS) was conceived by virtue of DECS Order No. 69, series of 1993. In the beginning of the school year 1994–1995, students were enrolled in Ligao National High School since BRSHS had no site of its own. The organization used the LNHS's facilities and classrooms for its daily operations.

In 2000, after six years of existence, BRSHS achieved independence and completely separated from its mother school. The institution was then transferred to barangay Tuburan.

References

1994 establishments in the Philippines
Schools in Albay
Educational institutions established in 1994
Regional Science High School Union
Science high schools in the Philippines